Yahaya Abubakar rtd GCFR is a traditional ruler who was born to the family of Alhaji Abubakar Saganuwa Nakordi Nupe/brother to the 11th Etsu Nupe Late Malam Musa Bello and his mother Hajiya Habiba Bantigi Ndayako daughter of the 9th Etsu Nupe and Sister to late Alhaji Umaru Sanda Ndayako the 12th Etsu Nupe Nupe Kingdom

Background
Yahaya was born on 12 September 1952 at Bida in Niger State and hails from one of  the ruling houses of Bida Emirate (Usman Zaki). He attended Government College, Sokoto and later Commercial College, Kano (1967–1971), then enrolled in to the Nigerian Defence Academy, Kaduna (1973–1975) in preparation for joining the Nigerian  Army.

Before his appointment as the Etsu Nupe he was the Kusodu Nupe, last military posting was to the Defense Headquarters Abuja, where he was a director of foreign operations, before retiring as a Brigadier General in September 2003.

Yahaya Abubakar Kusodu Nupe was appointed the 13th Etsu Nupe on 11 September 2003, the ruler of all the Nupe speaking people in the world (Etsu Nupe: The King of Nupe) in succession to his late uncle Alhaji Umar Sanda Ndayako.
By virtue of this title he is the Chairman of the Niger State Council of Traditional Rulers. He is the chairman, Coordinating Committee National Council of Traditional Rulers of Nigeria.

Other positions
The Emir chair the committee pushing for the creation of Edu State with headquarters at Bida out of the present Niger, kogi and Kwara states to form a homeland for the Nupe people.
Other promoters for the creation of Edu State are Etsu Lapai, Etsu Agaie, Etsu Lafiyagi, Etsu Tsaragi, Etsu Patigi, Etsu Tsonga, prominent Nupe elder statesmen across the nation and abroad.

He chaired the committee management Board of the Abuja National Mosque.

Following a scandal when it was found that a Nupe man, Alhaji Muhammadu Bello Masaba, had married 86 wives, the Etsu Nupe set up a five-member committee of Islamic scholars to handle the issue. In September 2008 it was reported that Masaba has agreed to divorce all but four of the wives.

References

Nigerian traditional rulers
Living people
1952 births
Emirs of Bida
Etsu Nupe
People from Bida
Nigerian Army officers
Nigerian Defence Academy alumni